Sunday News may refer to the following newspapers:

Sunday editions of newspapers
Sunday News (Lancaster), Pennsylvania, United States
Sunday News (New Zealand)
Sunday News (Sydney)
Sunday News (Tanzania)
Sunday News (UK), the later name of Lloyd's Weekly Newspaper
Sunday News (Daily News), New York, New York

See also

Sunday Edition (disambiguation)
Sunday (disambiguation)
News (disambiguation)
Weekly (disambiguation)